is the chief executive officer and the president of STUDIO4°C, an animation studio she founded in 1986.  Tanaka is also the chief executive officer of a producing company called Beyond C.

Eiko Tanaka was an animation producer on TEKKON KINKREET  and  MIND GAME, both STUDIO4°C films. She was also a producer on The Animatrix  project. Tanaka previously worked with Studio Ghibli as a line producer on My Neighbor Totoro and Kiki's Delivery Service.

References

External links

Living people
Japanese film producers
Japanese women film producers
People from Tokyo
Studio 4°C
Year of birth missing (living people)